The Ministry of Environmental Protection of the Republic of Serbia is the ministry in the Government of Serbia which is in the charge of the environmental protection. The current minister is Goran Trivan, in office since 29 June 2017.

History
The ministry was established on 31 July 1991. Over the years, several departments were added and removed in the Ministry's jurisdiction. The area covered by the Ministry mostly included Environmental Protection, Natural Resources, Spatial Planning.

From 2004 to 2007, the Environmental Protection department was under Ministry of Science jurisdiction.

In 2011, the Mining department of the Ministry of Mining and Energy was added to the Ministry only to be removed in 2014. In 2012, Environment department was moved into Ministry of Energy, Development, and Environment under Zorana Mihajlović.

The Ministry was abolished in 2014, as the Mining department was merged into Ministry of Mining and Energy.

In 2017, it was split from the Ministry of Agriculture and Environmental Protection.

List of ministers
Political Party:

References

External links
  

Environment
1991 establishments in Serbia
Ministries established in 1991
Serbia